Akram Pedramnia (Persian: اکرم پدرام‌نیا) (February 17, 1969) is an Iranian-Canadian writer, translator, Joycean scholar, researcher, activist, and physician. She has written, researched, and translated many English novels and political articles. She resides in Canada since 1998 when she had emigrated from Iran.

Biography 
Born and raised to a working-class family in Kashan, Pedramnia studied English literacy at the University of Tehran. She was admitted then to Iran University of Medical Sciences and graduated as a physician in 1997. In Canada, she obtained a Health informatics degree from McMaster University.

She is currently writing and translating about a variety of matters, including novels, literature critics, and social issues. Pedramnia has also frequently written for international Iranian newspapers and websites.

Books 
She is the author of three novels in the Persian language, نفیر کویر (Nefir Desert) in 2010 , زیگورات (Ziggurat) in 2011 , and زمستان تپه‌های سوما (Winter on the Soma Hills), on themes which reveal underlying social issues in Iran.

She was featured in one chapter of the book, Iranian Immigrants to Canada: Zahra Kazemi, Nazanin Afshin-Jam, Marina Nemat, Amir Khadir, Pedram Moallemian, Akram Pedramnia, Roxana Moslehi, 2010 

She has also translated into Persian texts by various authors such as Colm Tóibín, E. L. Doctorow, Naomi Klein, Joan London (Gilgamesh), Noam Chomsky (Failed States: The Abuse of Power and the Assault on Democracy), Richard B. Wright (Clara Callan), F. Scott Fitzgerald (Tender Is the Night, 2009), Vladimir Nabokov (Lolita, 2014) and James Joyce (Ulysses). A translation of Margaret Atwood's Alias Grace had not been published as of January 2019, as, according to Pedramnia, the publishers had requested cuts which she did not agree to.

Activism on censorship 
Pedramnia is best known for her work in challenging and criticizing Iranian censorship opposing freedom of speech and expression of writers and artists. In 2013 she translated Vladimir Nabokov's Lolita into Persian, almost sixty years after its only other Persian translation. The book was published in Afghanistan, another Persian language speaking nation and Iran's neighbouring country, by a Kabul-based publisher named Zaryab Publication. Soon after, Lolita found its way to the Iranian underground market. In response, the Iranian Minister of Cultural and Islamic Guidance declared that Pedramnia's translation is banned and has been disseminated illegally. The book was later published in a different format as samizdat inside Iran. Due to the same argument, her recent work, the translation of James Joyce's Ulysses, another forbidden book, has been planned for publication in six volumes by Nogaam Press, a Persian-language publisher based in London, England which aims to publish Persian writing and translation beyond the censorship concerns faced inside the country. The first volume was released in April 2019.

An article in The Globe and Mail describes her as "one of the strongest-willed translators active today. Confronting pernicious state-sponsored censorship, watching as dubious publishers eight time zones away put her work into print without permission or payment."

The Italian newspaper, Il Foglio writes: "This (Lolita) is my translation sold on the streets of Tehran," says Akram Pedramnia at this week's The Boston Globe. "The book is forbidden, but people send me these photographs, hiding their faces, of course. And they publish these images on social platforms, showing smuggling".

A German language newspaper Neue Zürcher Zeitung says: “Her translations are distributed as pirated or over the Internet without her earning a cent – but that does not bother Akram Pedramnia. She is even pleased. Thanks to her, Iranian readers can read Lolita or Tender Is the Night".

Awards 
Scholarship: James Joyce Foundation, Zurich, 2019
Translation Grant: Literature Ireland for Persian translation of Ulysses

Essays and lectures
James Joyce Symposium, Antwerp, 2018 (Lecture)
University College Dublin, Summer, 2018 (Lecture)
James Joyce Foundation, Zurich, 2019 (Lecture)
James Joyce Symposium, Mexico City, 2019 (Lecture)
Dublin James Joyce Journal, 2017 (Essay)
Free University of Berlin Bulletin, 2019 (Essay)

References

External links
 Akram Pedramnia - Solothurner Literaturtage 
 Joyce Scholarship and Looren Residency-Akram Pedramnia
 Akram Pedramnia's personal website
 Akram Pedramnia's list of published booksS

Iranian women physicians
Iranian women writers
Iranian writers
Iranian translators
Iranian literary critics
Iranian women poets
Iranian women novelists
Iranian novelists
English–Persian translators
University of Tehran alumni
People from Kashan
Living people
All articles with unsourced statements
1969 births
Iranian emigrants to Canada